Sir Stephen Martin Males (born 24 November 1955), styled The Rt. Hon. Lord Justice Males is a British judge who serves as a judge of the Court of Appeal of England and Wales, one of the Senior Courts of England and Wales.

Males attended The Skinners' School and St John's College, Cambridge, where he was awarded an MA degree in law in 1977.

Males was called to the bar (Middle Temple) in 1978 and became a Queen's Counsel in 1998. He was appointed a Recorder in 1999 and was Deputy High Court Judge until his promotion to the High Court, assigned to the Queen's Bench Division, on 1 October 2012, receiving the customary knighthood in the 2013 Special Honours. He was promoted to the Court of Appeal in 2019, receiving the customary appointment to the Privy Council of the United Kingdom, allowing him the Honorific Title "The Right Honourable" for life.

References

1955 births
Living people
People educated at The Skinners' School
Alumni of St John's College, Cambridge
21st-century English judges
Knights Bachelor
Lords Justices of Appeal
Queen's Bench Division judges
Members of the Privy Council of the United Kingdom